Manifesteange Metamorphose temps de fille (Shortened to Metamorphose temps de fille, Metamorphose or Meta) is the name of a Japanese clothing boutique chain created in 1997 by the current president of Metamorphose and its designer, Kuniko Kato. Metamorphose specializes in the Lolita fashion and like Baby, The Stars Shine Bright, their main focus is the subcategory Sweet Lolita.

Name origin 

Metamorphose's website wrote that: "'Manifesteange' means the advent of an angel. 'Metamorphose temps de fille' means 'the time of transformation into a little girl.'"  
The fictitious word "manifesteange" is thought to be taken from the word manifestation or to manifest, and metamorphose from "metamorphosis", which means "to go through a drastic change".

Metamorphose state they have used the French language to coin the phrase "Manifesteange Metamorphose temps de fille"; however, the French is worded with grammatical errors. "Metamorphose temps de fille" in French would literally translate to "Transforms time of the little girl". This is due to being translated directly from Japanese grammar. In Japanese, the expression "Chisai toki" means "in 'little' time", and is used in place of the English expression "When I was young".

Metamorphose defend the mistranslation by saying that "because we invented the name ourselves, we feel there are so many different nuances and connotations that can be read into it, and we invite you to create your own."

Brand concept  

Metamorphose's website states, "Almost everyone has the desire to “transform” one's self, be it into an angel, someone who is more elegant, or even back to the time they were a little girl. With this concept in mind, we created the Metamorphose brand. In order to assist you in your “transformation”, while not being a slave to the current fashion, we continue to conceive cute EGL fashion."

Metamorphose are possibly the most imaginative of all the Japanese Lolita brands; they have developed a label within western lolita circles as being creative by having untraditional (in lolita fashion terms) cuts and prints of clothes; these include retro style prints, circle skirts, and camouflage.

Metamorphose is one of the more accessible Japanese Lolita brands to foreign customers. They have a translation of their website in English, ship abroad and accept PayPal, unlike other Lolita brands, which usually are not available overseas without the use of a shopping service.

Because Kuniko Kato herself may be considered 'plus sized' in Japan, many Western girls find Metamorphose brand clothes an easier fit than other brands whose clothes tend to run a lot smaller. Many 'plus sized' Lolitas have found that Metamorphose clothes, which are made in one size only, can fit quite comfortably.

Go! Go! Lolita-chan 

"Go! Go! Lolita-chan" is Metamorphose's news and information page in the English version of their site. It is divided between "News & Tidbits", "Pictures of You & Us" and "Metamorphose's Lovely Characters".

"News & Tidbits" relates to upcoming collections and their pre-orders, shop holidays, sales and lucky packs. It sometimes takes the form of a conversational blog and occasionally contains recommended reading and advice on coordinating the fashion.

"Pictures of You & Us" contains galleries of modelled co-ordinates and a world map that shows the location and pictures of their worldwide customers.

"Metamorphose Lovely Characters" contains pictures and information on Metamorphose's mascots: Punky Bear (Punkma) the bear and Rabbie-chan (Ra-bitch-chang) the rabbit.

See also 
Gothic Lolita
Lolita Fashion
Sweet Lolita

Notes

External links 
 
 Metamorphose temps de fille official website in English

References 

Clothing companies of Japan
Retail companies established in 1997
1997 establishments in Japan
Lolita fashion